Mark Bradford (born October 7, 1984) is a former American football wide receiver. He played for the California Redwoods of the United Football League, and was signed by the Dallas Cowboys of the NFL as an undrafted free agent in 2008. He played college football at Stanford.

Bradford was also a member of the San Francisco 49ers.

Early years
Bradford graduated in 2003 from Fremont High School in Los Angeles, California and was one of the best receivers in the nation at the time, being ranked by PrepStar as the No.4 wide receiver in the country and as the No. 1 in the west.  Not only talented as a wide receiver on the grid iron, Bradford was able to showcase his skills on the basketball court and was a two-time All-City selection in both sports.  Mark played basketball for the Stanford Cardinal during his freshman and sophomore years of college but then quit to focus on football.

References

External links

 Just Sports Stats

1984 births
Living people
American football wide receivers
Dallas Cowboys players
San Francisco 49ers players
Sacramento Mountain Lions players
Stanford Cardinal football players
Players of American football from Los Angeles